A pipe wrench is any of several types of wrench that are designed to turn threaded pipe and pipe fittings for assembly (tightening) or disassembly (loosening). The Stillson wrench, or Stillson-pattern wrench, is the usual form of pipe wrench, especially in North America. The Stillson name is that of the original patent holder, who licensed the design to a number of manufacturers. The patent expired decades ago. Another type of wrench often used on pipes, the plumber wrench, is also called a pipe wrench in some places.

The Stillson wrench is an adjustable wrench (spanner) with hardened serrated teeth on its jaws. The hard teeth bite into the softer metal of the round pipe and provide the grip needed to turn a pipe, even against fair resistance. The design of the adjustable jaw, which permits a certain amount of intentional play out of square, allows it to bind on the pipe, with forward pressure on the handle pulling the jaws tighter. On some models, two leaf springs, above and below the knurled adjusting knob, help unlock the jaw when pressure on the handle of the wrench is released. 

Pipe wrenches are not intended for regular use on hex nuts or other fittings. However, if a hex nut becomes rounded (stripped) so that it cannot be moved by standard wrenches, a pipe wrench can be used to free the bolt or nut, because the pipe wrench is designed to bite into rounded metal surfaces. 

Pipe wrenches are classified by the length of the handle. They are usually made of cast steel. Today, aluminium might be used to construct the body of the wrench, although the teeth and jaw remain steel. Teeth and jaw kits (which also contain adjustment rings and springs) can be bought to repair broken wrenches.

History 

Daniel C. Stillson (1826-1899), a mechanic at the Walworth Company, in Cambridge, Massachusetts, created the first such wrench. On October 12, 1869, U.S. patent #95,744 was issued to Stillson.

On 17 August 1888, the Swedish inventor Johan Petter Johansson (1853-1943) took out his first patent on the adjustable pipe wrench. The Swedish Patent Office issued the patent again in 1894. The idea emerged after he established his company Enköpings Mekaniska Verkstad. Back then, nut dimensions were poorly standardized, so each time a tradesman was out on a job, he needed a trolley to take a set of fixed pipe wrenches with him. Johansson's tool could grip nuts of different dimensions.

Pipe wrench in different countries 

In South Africa, the terms "bobbejaan spanner" and "baboon spanner" are commonly used, especially for large pipe wrenches. "Bobbejaan" is the Afrikaans term for a baboon.
 
In Spain and Morocco they are known and called grifa.

In Mexico they are known and called stillson without even calling it "llave" or wrench.

In Turkey they are known as English Keys.

See also 
 Adjustable wrench – a straight-jawed adjustable wrench with jaws in line with its handle
 Monkey wrench – a straight-jawed adjustable wrench similar to a pipe wrench and often confused with it
 Nipple wrench (plumbing) – a pipe wrench that grabs the interior
 Plumber wrench – a wrench used for turning pipes and tightening hex nuts

References

External links
Biography of Daniel C. Stillson and background on the development of the Stillson wrench.
Adjustable wrenches review

American inventions
Wrenches
Piping
Plumbing